The 2005–06 All-Ireland Junior Club Hurling Championship was the third staging of the All-Ireland Junior Club Hurling Championship since its establishment by the Gaelic Athletic Association  in 2002.

The All-Ireland final was played on 12 February 2006 at Croke Park in Dublin, between Fr. O'Neill's from Cork and Erin's Own from Carlow, in what was their first ever meeting in the final. Fr. O'Neill's won the match by 2-16 to 2-10 to claim their first ever All-Ireland title.

Munster Junior Club Hurling Championship

Munster quarter-finals

Munster semi-finals

Munster final

All-Ireland Junior Club Hurling Championship

All-Ireland quarter-final

All-Ireland semi-finals

All-Ireland final

Championship statistics

Miscellaneous

 Erin's Own became the first Carlow club to win a Leinster Championship title in any grade.

References

All-Ireland Junior Club Hurling Championship
All-Ireland Junior Club Hurling Championship
All-Ireland Junior Club Hurling Championship